Yonko Nedelchev (born 6 July 1974) is a former Bulgarian footballer who played as a defender.

Career
Coming through the youth ranks of Rozova Dolina in Kazanlak, Nedelchev spent his entire career in his country, reaching a Bulgarian Cup final with Levski Sofia in 1997. He is a former member of the Bulgaria U21 team. Nedelchev is known as a passionate player and is popular with Botev Plovdiv supporters.

References

1974 births
Living people
Association football defenders
Bulgarian footballers
PFC Levski Sofia players
Botev Plovdiv players
PFC Lokomotiv Plovdiv players
PFC Beroe Stara Zagora players
Second Professional Football League (Bulgaria) players
First Professional Football League (Bulgaria) players
Bulgaria youth international footballers